Elisabeth Pinajeff (born Elizabeta Sergeyevna Pinayeva; , 17 April 1900 – 31 December 1995) was a Russian-German actress.

Selected filmography
 Count Cohn (1923)
 Darling of the King (1924)
 The Brigantine of New York (1924)
 The Adventure of Mr. Philip Collins (1925)
 People of the Sea (1925)
 The Three Mannequins (1926)
 The Laughing Husband (1926)
 I Liked Kissing Women (1926)
 Lace (1926)
 Rinaldo Rinaldini (1927)
 Rhenish Girls and Rhenish Wine (1927)
 Love on Skis (1928)
 The Gallant Hussar (1928)
 A Better Master (1928)
 Mikosch Comes In (1928)
 The Sinner (1928)
 The Lady and the Chauffeur (1928)
 A Mother's Love (1929)
 Rooms to Let (1930)
 Tingel-Tangel (1930)
 Shadows of the Underworld (1931)
 Madame Makes Her Exit (1932)
 The Triangle of Fire (1932)

References

Bibliography
 Prawer, S.S. Between Two Worlds: The Jewish Presence in German and Austrian Film, 1910–1933. Berghahn Books, 2007.

External links

1900 births
1995 deaths
Russian film actresses
Russian silent film actresses
20th-century Russian actresses
Emigrants from the Russian Empire to Germany
Emigrants from the Russian Empire to France
Actors from Dnipro